Tres Picachos (Spanish for Three Little Peaks) is one of the highest peaks in Puerto Rico at . It is located on the border between  the municipalities of Ciales and Jayuya in the central part of the island, and is part of the Cordillera Central.

The mountain has three joint peaks from which the name is derived. It is believed that Taíno Indians thought the mountain to be sacred.

References

Ciales, Puerto Rico
Jayuya, Puerto Rico
Mountains of Puerto Rico
Mountains of the Caribbean

Geography of Puerto Rico